Selous is a village in Mashonaland West province in Zimbabwe. It lies not far from Harare on the main Harare to Bulawayo road.

It is named after the British explorer and hunter Frederick Selous.

In 1985, novelist Tom Robbins wrote a column for Esquire detailing his tumultuous travels to reach the village entitled "The Day The Earth Spit Warthogs."

Populated places in Mashonaland West Province